Protein phosphatase 1D is an enzyme that in humans is encoded by the PPM1D gene.

The protein encoded by this gene is a member of the PP2C family of Ser/Thr protein phosphatases. PP2C family members are known to be negative regulators of cell stress response pathways. The expression of this gene is induced in a p53-dependent manner in response to various environmental stresses. While being induced by tumor suppressor protein TP53/p53, this phosphatase negatively regulates the activity of p38 MAP kinase (MAPK/p38) through which it reduces the phosphorylation of p53, and in turn suppresses p53-mediated transcription and apoptosis. This phosphatase thus mediates a feedback regulation of p38-p53 signaling that contributes to growth inhibition and the suppression of stress induced apoptosis. This gene is located in a chromosomal region known to be amplified in breast cancer. The amplification of this gene has been detected in both breast cancer cell line and primary breast tumors, which suggests a role of this gene in cancer development.

Interactions
PPM1D has been shown to interact with CDC5L.

References

Further reading